Bentley Run is a  long 2nd order tributary to South Branch French Creek in Erie County, Pennsylvania.

Course
Bentley Run rises in Union Township of southern Erie County, Pennsylvania and flows southwest towards Union City, Pennsylvania.

Watershed
Bentley Run drains 4.1 square miles of Erie Drift Plain (glacial geology).  The watershed receives an average of 46.4 in/year of precipitation.

References

Rivers of Erie County, Pennsylvania